Boyer River is a stream in Alberta, Canada.

Boyer River may have the name of Charles Boyer, an 18th-century trader.

See also
List of rivers of Alberta

References

Rivers of Alberta